Liu Shishi (born 10 March 1987), also known as Cecilia Liu, is a Chinese actress best known for portraying Long Kui in the television series Chinese Paladin 3 and Ruoxi in the Chinese time-travel drama Scarlet Heart and Imperial Doctress. She is also known as one of the New Four Dan Actresses.

Career

2005–2010: Beginnings and Rising popularity
Having been trained in ballet at the Beijing Dance Academy, Liu Shishi made her acting debut in the television drama series The Moon and the Wind (2005). She included a segment of Swan Lake in one of her scenes. She then starred in wuxia drama The Young Warriors (2006) and shenmo television series The Fairies of Liaozhai (2007).

In 2007, Liu graduated from Beijing Dance Academy and was signed on by Tangren Media, successfully making her transition from a dancer to an actress. She then starred as Mu Nianci in the wuxia drama The Legend of the Condor Heroes (2008), which gained her more recognition.

In 2009, Liu gained popularity after appearing in the hit fantasy action drama Chinese Paladin 3; her role as Long Kui broke her previous typecasting as a "gentle, kind, and understanding maiden" and received positive reviews from critics and fans.

In 2010, Liu starred in the historical drama A Weaver on the Horizon, based on the life story of Huang Daopo. Originally cast in the role of the lead female protagonist, Liu instead chose to portray the  princess Zhao Jiayi, as she felt that the character's developments would challenge her acting.

2011–2012: Breakthrough and Film debut
The year 2011 saw Liu's further rise in popularity with two successful dramas. She starred alongside Wallace Huo in period action drama  The Vigilantes In Masks, which received positive reviews and led to increased popularity for Liu. She then played the female protagonist, Ruoxi in the time travel historical romance series, Scarlet Heart, based on the novel Bu Bu Jing Xin by Tong Hua. Scarlet Heart became a major sleeper hit in China, and swiftly gained popularity across East Asia. Liu, then a rising actress, was propelled to stardom.
Liu bagged several awards at local award-giving bodies for her performance, including Most Popular Actress awards at the China TV Drama Awards and Shanghai Television Festival.

Liu then focused her career on the big screen; she made her feature film debut in The Next Miracle, directed by Taiwanese filmmaker Zhuo Li. She also filmed two other movies, Sad Fairy Tale and A Moment of Love.

In 2012, Liu starred in fantasy action drama Xuan-Yuan Sword: Scar of Sky, adapted from the video game of the same name. The series topped TV ratings and garnered 2 billion views online, becoming the 9th drama in Hunan TV's broadcast history to achieve that feat.
Liu's soaring popularity due to Scarlet Heart in 2011 coupled with Xuan-Yuan Sword: Scar of Sky in 2012 allowed her to become the "Golden Eagle Goddess" at the 9th China Golden Eagle TV Art Festival. Liu was also chosen by Southern Metropolis Daily as one of the new Four Dan Actresses alongside Angelababy, Yang Mi and Ni Ni.

2013–present: Mainstream popularity
In 2013, Liu starred in action comedy Badges of Fury alongside Jet Li. She then starred in wuxia film Brotherhood of Blades, alongside Taiwanese actor Chang Chen, which received critical acclaim. Liu was nominated for Best Actress at the China Film Directors' Guild Awards for her performance.

In 2014, Liu returned to the small screen with historical romance drama Sound of the Desert, based on the novel Ballad of the Desert written by Tong Hua. The series topped television and web ratings domestically, and was also well-received overseas. Liu then starred in romance film Five Minutes to Tomorrow playing dual roles. She and co-stars Haruma Miura and Joseph Chang attended the 19th Busan International Film Festival for the premiere of the film, where she received the Asia Star Award.

In 2016, Liu headlined the historical drama The Imperial Doctress, based on the life of Tan Yunxian, a famous female physician during China's Ming Dynasty. The drama topped television ratings its run and received positive reviews, and Liu won the Most Influential Actress award at 1st China Television Drama Quality Ceremony for her performance.

In 2017, Liu starred along veteran actors Wang Qianyuan and Cao Bingkun in the spy drama, The Battle at Dawn; produced by the Ministry of Public Security. The same year, she played a young single mother in romance melodrama Angelo alongside Ming Dao. Liu then starred in historical fantasy drama Lost Love in Times alongside William Chan, as well as the crime suspense film The Liquidator where she played a palaeoichnology expert.

In 2019, Liu starred in the romance melodrama If I Can Love You So alongside Tong Dawei. The series has previously completed filming in 2016. The same year, she announced her comeback after two years with the female-centric modern drama To Dear Myself.

Personal life
Liu Shishi's grandfather, Liu Tianli, was born in Wudi County, Shandong Province. He was an artist of Xihe drum performance and was known as the "Master of Drums".

Both parents were factory workers. Liu Shishi's mother retired early due to health reasons, while her father went overseas to do business.

Liu registered her marriage with Scarlet Heart co-star Nicky Wu on January 20, 2015 and the wedding ceremony was held in Bali, Indonesia on March 20, 2016.

On April 28, 2019, Liu gave birth to their son.

Filmography

Film

Television series

Short film

Music video

Discography

Awards and nominations

2020|Cosmo Glam Night
|Person of the year award

Forbes China Celebrity 100

References

External links

Liu Shishi's Weibo 

1987 births
21st-century Chinese actresses
21st-century Chinese women singers
Actresses from Beijing
Beijing Dance Academy alumni
Chinese ballerinas
Chinese film actresses
Chinese television actresses
Hui actresses
Living people
Singers from Beijing